Walulis sieht fern (English: Walulis watches TV) is a satirical German television show broadcast on digital television channel EinsPlus. The show was created and is presented by its namesake, Philipp Walulis. It parodies German television under the motto "Fernsehen macht blöd, aber auch unglaublich viel Spaß!" (TV makes you stupid, but also is incredibly much fun!) 
The show was discontinued because of the switching off of the channel "EinsPlus" in 2016. Now you can watch it on YouTube and "funk" on the channel "Walulis". The videos are uploaded twice a week. There's also the channel "Walulis Daily", in the same kind like "Walulis", with daily uploads and it looks like a typical late-night-show.

References

Radio Bremen
Television in Germany
2010s German television series
2011 German television series debuts
German satirical television shows
German-language television shows
Das Erste original programming